Obra is a constituency of the Uttar Pradesh Legislative Assembly covering the city of Obra in the Sonbhadra district of Uttar Pradesh, India.

Obra is one of five assembly constituencies in the Robertsganj Lok Sabha constituency and is reserved for candidates of the Scheduled Tribes.

Election results

2022

2017
Bharatiya Janta Party candidate Sanjiv Kumar won in 2017 Uttar Pradesh Legislative Elections defeating Samajwadi Party candidate Ravi Gond by a margin of 44,269 votes.

References

External links
 

Assembly constituencies of Uttar Pradesh
Sonbhadra district